

Technology
Spinner (aeronautics), the aerodynamic cone at the hub of an aircraft propeller
Spinner (cell culture), laboratory equipment for cultivating plant or mammalian cells
Spinner (computing), a graphical widget in a GUI
Spinner (MIT Media Lab), software that can automatically edit video to fit a narrative structure

Arts and entertainment
Spinner (album), a 1995 album by Brian Eno & Jah Wobble
Spinner (Blade Runner), a flying car from the film Blade Runner

People
Spinner (surname)
Brian Spencer (1949–1988), Canadian National Hockey League player nicknamed "Spinner"

Fictional characters
Spinner (My Hero Academia), a character in the manga series My Hero Academia
Spinner Mason, in the TV series Degrassi: The Next Generation
Spinner, in the animated TV series Clutch Cargo
Dorothy Spinner, a DC Comics character.
Spinner, a villain of Batman from DC Comics

Sports and games 
Spinner (dominoes), a domino tile that may be played on four ways
a spin bowler in cricket
a style of delivery in Ten-pin bowling
Fidget spinner, a stress relieving toy

Other uses
a person who spins textiles
a person who engages in article spinning
Spinnerbait, a type of fishing lure
Spinner (website), a music website owned by AOL
Spinner (wheel), an accessory that goes on an automobile wheel and spins independently
Spinner, a locomotive of the former Midland Railway 115 Class in the UK
a machine used to do spin coating in manufacturing
a wind spinner or whirligig

See also
Spinner dolphin, a dolphin species
Spinner shark, a shark species
Spinor (mathematics)
Spinners (disambiguation)
Bamboo-copter, a spinner toy